Michael Linzer (born 2 November 1989) is an Austrian professional tennis player and competes mainly on the ATP Challenger Tour and ITF Futures, both in singles and doubles.

Linzer reached his highest ATP singles ranking, No. 236 on 20 August 2012, and his highest ATP doubles ranking, No. 380, on 30 July 2012. He made his ATP main draw debut at the 2016 Romanian Open.

ATP career finals (1)

Doubles (1)

References

External links
 
 

1989 births
Living people
Austrian male tennis players
People from Oberpullendorf District
Sportspeople from Burgenland